Jane Therese Curtin (born September 6, 1947) is an American actress and comedian. First coming to prominence as an original cast member on the hit TV comedy series Saturday Night Live in 1975, she went on to win back-to-back Emmy Awards for Best Lead Actress in a Comedy Series on the 1980s sitcom Kate & Allie portraying the role of Allison "Allie" Lowell. Curtin later starred in the hit series 3rd Rock from the Sun (1996–2001), playing the role of Dr. Mary Albright.

Curtin has also appeared in many movie roles, including Charlene in The Librarian series of movies (2004–2008). She reprised one of her Saturday Night Live characters, Prymaat (Clorhone) Conehead, in the 1993 film Coneheads. She is sometimes referred to as the "Queen of Deadpan". The Philadelphia Inquirer once called her a "refreshing drop of acid". She was included on a 1986 list of the "Top Prime Time Actors and Actresses of All Time".

Early life 
Jane Therese Curtin was born in Cambridge, Massachusetts, the second of three children born to Mary Constance (née Farrell) and John Joseph Curtin, who owned an insurance agency. Her maternal ancestry is Irish, while the paternal, Curtin, ancestry is Irish, originally from Newmarket-on-Fergus, County Clare. Curtin has one younger brother, Larry Curtin, who lives in South Florida; and an older brother, John J. "Jack" Curtin ( 2008). Curtin is a cousin of actress and writer Valerie Curtin. Her uncle was the radio personality Joseph Curtin.

She was raised Roman Catholic, and grew up in Wellesley, Massachusetts. She graduated from Newton Country Day School of the Sacred Heart in Newton in 1965. Curtin earned an associate degree from Elizabeth Seton Junior College in New York City, class of 1967. She then attended Northeastern University from 1967 to 1968 before dropping out of college to pursue a career in comedy.

Career 
She has served as a U.S. Committee National Ambassador for UNICEF. In 1968, Curtin decided to pursue comedy as a career and dropped out of college. She joined a comedy group, The Proposition, and performed with them until 1972. She starred in Pretzels, an off-Broadway play written by Curtin, John Forster, Judith Kahan, and Fred Grandy, in 1974.

Saturday Night Live 
One of the original Not Ready For Prime Time Players of NBC's Saturday Night Live (1975), Curtin remained on the show through the 1979–1980 season. Guest host Eric Idle said that Curtin was "very much a 'Let's come in, let's know our lines, let's do it properly, and go' ... She was very sensible, very focused", and disliked the drug culture in which many of the cast participated. Show writer Al Franken stated that she "was so steady. Had a really strong moral center, and as such was disgusted by much of the show and the people around it".

On the show, and mirroring her own low-key real life, she frequently played straight-woman characters, often as a foil to John Belushi and Gilda Radner. Curtin anchored SNL'''s "Weekend Update" segment from 1976 to 1977, paired with Dan Aykroyd from 1977 to 1978 and Bill Murray from 1978 to 1980. On occasional "Weekend Update" segments, her newscaster character served as a foil to John Belushi, who often gave a rambling and out-of-control "commentary" on events of the day. During these sketches, she timidly tried to get Belushi to come to the point, which would only make him angrier. Curtin's newscaster also introduced baseball expert Chico Escuela (Garrett Morris), a heavily accented Dominican, who started his sketches by saying, "Thank you, Hane", before repeating his famous catchphrase, "Baseball been bery, bery good to me!" She also introduced Roseanne Roseannadanna (Gilda Radner) and would listen in exasperated silence at Roseannadanna's disjointed commentary before ultimately cutting her off.  In addition, she sang in the "Chevy's Girls" sketch in season two, episode two, alongside Laraine Newman and Gilda Radner.

In a parody of the "Point-Counterpoint" segment of the news program 60 Minutes, Curtin delivered a controlled liberal viewpoint (à la Shana Alexander) vs. Dan Aykroyd, who (in the manner of James J. Kilpatrick) epitomized the right-wing view, albeit with an over-the-top "attack" journalist slant. Curtin presented the liberal "Point" portion first. Then Aykroyd presented the "Counterpoint" portion, sometimes beginning with the statement, "Jane, you ignorant slut," to which she replied, "Dan, you pompous ass." The recurring segment has been discussed in an article on "How to Respectfully Disagree" in The Chronicle of Higher Education.

Curtin is also well known for her role in the Conehead sketches as Prymaat (wife/mother of the Conehead family), and as Enid Loopner (in sketches with Gilda Radner and Bill Murray). She is one of many cast members who appear in the retrospective compilation DVD The Women of SNL (2010, 97 minutes).

 Later television work 
Unlike many of her fellow SNL cast members who ventured successfully into film, Curtin chose to stay mainly in television, with a few sporadic film appearances. To date, she has starred in two long-running television sitcoms. First, in Kate & Allie (1984–89), with Susan Saint James, she played a single mother named "Allie Lowell" and twice won the Emmy Award for Best Lead Actress in a Comedy Series.

Following Kate & Allie, Curtin co-starred on the 1990 sitcom Working It Out with Stephen Collins. The series was created by Bill Persky, a writer, director, and producer of Kate & Allie, but it was not successful and was cancelled after 13 episodes. Later, she was part of the cast of 3rd Rock from the Sun (1996–2001) playing a human, Dr. Mary Albright, opposite the alien family composed of John Lithgow, Kristen Johnston, French Stewart, and Joseph Gordon-Levitt. As with SNL, her mostly strait-laced character was often confounded by the zany and whimsical antics of the Solomon family.

In 1997, Curtin narrated two episodes of the documentary television series Understanding, and she has done voice work for Recess and Cyberchase. She guest starred on Sesame Street in 1985.

Curtin also starred with Fred Savage in the ABC sitcom Crumbs, which debuted in January 2006 and was cancelled in May of that year. She also guest-starred on Gary Unmarried as Connie, Allison's mother. In 2012, she joined Unforgettable as Dr. Joanne Webster, a gifted but crusty medical examiner; in 2014, she occasionally reprised her role as the first Guardian on The Librarians. In 2020, she had a co-starring role as a quirky mother-in-law on the ABC sitcom United We Fall.

 Film 
In 1980, Curtin starred with Susan Saint James and Jessica Lange in the moderate hit How to Beat the High Cost of Living. In 1993, Curtin and Dan Aykroyd were reunited in Coneheads, a full-length motion picture based on their popular SNL characters. They also appeared together as the voices of a pair of wasps in the film Antz. In 2009, she played Paul Rudd and Andy Samberg's mother in I Love You, Man. In 2013, she took a small role in The Heat as Mrs. Mullins, the mother of Detective Mullins. Curtin played Moira, the Headmistress of the Motherland, in Disney's Godmothered.

 Other work 
Curtin has also performed on Broadway on occasion. She first appeared on the Great White Way as Miss Proserpine Garnett in the play Candida in 1981. She later went on to be a replacement actress in two other plays, Love Letters and Noises Off, and was in the 2002 revival of Our Town, which received huge press attention as Paul Newman returned to the Broadway stage after several decades away.

She also has narrated several audio books, including Carl Hiaasen's novel Nature Girl.

On May 7, 2010, Curtin placed second in the Jeopardy! Million Dollar Celebrity Invitational, winning $250,000 for the U.S. Fund for UNICEF. Michael McKean won the tournament, while Cheech Marin came in third.

She presented Emmy Awards in 1984, 1987, and 1998; the 11th Annual American Comedy Awards in 1997; and the 54th Annual Golden Globe Awards in 1997.

Curtin has guest hosted several episodes of Selected Shorts'' produced by Symphony Space and distributed by Public Radio International.

Personal life
She married television producer Patrick Francis Lynch on April 2, 1975; they have one daughter, Tess Curtin Lynch, born in 1983. They live in Sharon, Connecticut.

Filmography

Film

Television

References

External links 

 

 
 
 
 
 https://web.archive.org/web/20190406100758/https://www.biography.com/people/jane-curtin-222399

1947 births
20th-century American comedians
21st-century American comedians
20th-century American actresses
21st-century American actresses
Actresses from Cambridge, Massachusetts
Actresses from Massachusetts
American film actresses
American people of Irish descent
American sketch comedians
American television actresses
American women comedians
Comedians from Massachusetts
Living people
Northeastern University alumni
Outstanding Performance by a Lead Actress in a Comedy Series Primetime Emmy Award winners
People from Wellesley, Massachusetts